The Portland Farmers Market may refer to:
Portland Farmers Market (Maine)
Portland Farmers Market (Oregon)